Daud "Cino" Yordan (born 10 June 1987) is an Indonesian professional boxer and former IBO Featherweight and Lightweight Champion.

Early life and family
Yordan was born in Ketapang, West Borneo, Indonesia on 10 June 1987. He is the fifth child of six children to Hermanus Lai Cun, a Chinese father and Natalia, a Dayak mother.

His former trainer, Carlos Jesus Penate Torres from Cuba give his nickname Cino (Chino in Spanish). Since then he is always known by the nickname.

Professional career
Yordan won his first 23 fights, most against national level opponents, which included notable wins against Surasak Makordae and José Antonio Meza Jimenez, the latter being his American debut. He then fought Robert Guerrero, his first fight on HBO, where the fight ended as a no contest after an accidental head clash in the second round. After this he started fighting higher level opponents, beating Robert Allanic, by KO, and Ricky Sismundo, by TKO. Yordan suffered his first professional loss against the seasoned veteran Celestino Caballero by UD. He won his first minor belt, the WBO Asia-Pacific Featherweight Title, after defeating Damian David Marchiano.

Yordan then fought for the WBA featherweight title against Chris John on 17 April 2011 at the Jakarta International Expo, Kemayoran, Central Jakarta where he lost by unanimous decision. Yordan continued to fight higher level opponents which resulted in him winning the IBO featherweight title after beating Lorenzo Villanueva. He made his first defense of his title against Choi Tseveenpurev, which he won by UD. He then lost his title to Simpiwe Vetyeka after losing to him by a TKO in the twelfth round.

After this loss he moved up to lightweight where he instantly won the IBO belt against Daniel Brizuela by UD. He defended the title against Sipho Taliwe where some critics thought he lost as he scraped through to get a SD win. During 2014 to 2017 he went on to win his next 5 fights at lightweight beating questionably lower level opponents which resulted in him rising through the WBO lightweight rankings and accumulating the WBO Asia-Pacific and Africa Lightweight Title, WBO Africa Lightweight Title and the WBA International Lightweight Title after defeating Cristian Rafael Coria. Yordan then beat previously unbeaten Pavel Malikov on 22 April 2018 by a KO which was caused by an impressive combination that targeted Malikov's body. This won him the WBO Inter-Continental Lightweight Title and cemented his name in future title eliminators and title fights.

Yordan called out former WBC, WBA and The Ring lightweight champion Jorge Linares on Instagram in August 2018 and a future fight between them is lingering as Linares continues to rebuild his career after being stopped by Vasyl Lomachenko.

Yordan fought Anthony Crolla on 10 November 2018 in the Manchester Arena. Crolla had a good start over Yordan, whose big moment came in the sixth round, when he pressured Crolla against the ropes and caused Crolla some punishment. Crolla regained himself in the remainer of the fight, and won the fight via unanimous decision.

In his next fight, Yordan beat Aekkawee Kaewmanee in a rough match, via sixth round TKO.

On November 17, 2019, Yordan fought and defeated Michael Mokoena via eighth round TKO.

On November 19, 2021, Yordan won the WBC Asian Boxing Council Silver Super Lightweight title by defeating Thai boxer Rachata Khaophimai. He won the match by TKO in the fifth round.

On July 1, 2022 Yordan defended the WBC Asian Boxing Council Silver Super Lightweight Title by defeating Thai boxer Panya Uthok and won the match by TKO in the sixth round.

Professional boxing record

Notes

References

External links

Daud Yordan - Profile, News Archive & Current Rankings at Box.Live

|-

|-

1987 births
Living people
Dayak people
Indonesian people of Chinese descent
Indonesian sportspeople of Chinese descent
Indonesian Roman Catholics
People from Ketapang Regency
Indonesian male boxers
Featherweight boxers
Super-featherweight boxers
Lightweight boxers
International Boxing Organization champions
21st-century Indonesian people